Ryan Austin Nobles (born September 15, 1976) is an American journalist. He was a Congressional correspondent for CNN, and also a fill-in anchor for CNN shows, until 2022, when he joined NBC News, where he continues to cover Congress, based in Washington, D.C.. Previously, he worked for WWBT/NBC12.

Youth and education 
Ryan Nobles went to the State University of New York College at Brockport from 1994 to 1998 where he graduated at the top of his class. He completed his Bachelor of Communication there. From 2003 to 2005 he attended the State University of New York at Albany where he completed a Master of Public Administration.

References

External links 
 RunningMate podcast.
 

1976 births
Living people
University at Albany, SUNY alumni
State University of New York at Brockport alumni
American television reporters and correspondents
News & Documentary Emmy Award winners
CNN people